Penicillium kojigenum is an anamorph species of the genus of Penicillium.

References

kojigenum
Fungi described in 1961